Jonathan López Pérez (born 16 April 1981), known simply as Jonathan, is a Spanish former professional footballer who played as a goalkeeper.

Club career
Born in Riaño, Langreo, Asturias, Jonathan was a product of Valencia CF's youth system. However, during his lengthy link with the club he could never appear officially with the first team, playing four seasons with the reserves in the lower leagues and also being loaned two times; he was first-choice for CD Numancia and Real Oviedo, being relegated from Segunda División with the latter side.

Jonathan terminated his contract with the Che after a loan with Córdoba CF in the Segunda División B. He returned to the second tier afterwards, signing for Albacete Balompié and starting for the better part of his stint.

In 2009–10, Jonathan had his first taste of top-flight football, joining Levadiakos F.C. in Greece but being released at the end of the campaign without making a single competitive appearance. He then returned to his country's division three, successively representing CD Roquetas and Burgos CF.

Again as a free agent, Jonathan returned to Greece and its Super League in the summer of 2012, with Veria FC. He made his official debut on 15 September precisely against Levadiakos, being sent off in the last minutes of the match following a second bookable offence but contributing to a 0–0 away draw with a series of saves, including one from the penalty spot.

In July 2014, Jonathan moved back to his homeland and agreed to a one-year deal at Getafe CF. He made his La Liga debut the following 8 February at the age of 33 years and 10 months, in a 2–1 home win over Sevilla FC.

Jonathan left the club on 3 June 2015, after his contract expired. Subsequently, he rejoined Veria for two seasons.

References

External links

1981 births
Living people
Spanish footballers
Footballers from Asturias
Association football goalkeepers
La Liga players
Segunda División players
Segunda División B players
Tercera División players
Valencia CF Mestalla footballers
Valencia CF players
CD Numancia players
Real Oviedo players
Córdoba CF players
Albacete Balompié players
CD Roquetas footballers
Burgos CF footballers
Getafe CF footballers
Super League Greece players
Football League (Greece) players
Levadiakos F.C. players
Veria F.C. players
Apollon Pontou FC players
Spain youth international footballers
Spanish expatriate footballers
Expatriate footballers in Greece
Spanish expatriate sportspeople in Greece